This is a list of published International Organization for Standardization (ISO) standards and other deliverables. For a complete and up-to-date list of all the ISO standards, see the ISO catalogue.

The standards are protected by copyright and most of them must be purchased. However, about 300 of the standards produced by ISO and IEC's Joint Technical Committee 1 (JTC 1) have been made freely and publicly available.

ISO 16000 – ISO 16999
 ISO/TR 16015:2003 Geometrical product specifications (GPS) - Systematic errors and contributions to measurement uncertainty of length measurement due to thermal influences
 ISO 16016:2016 Technical product documentation – Protection notices for restricting the use of documents and products
 ISO 16020:2005 Steel for the reinforcement and prestressing of concrete – Vocabulary
 ISO/IEC 16022:2006 Information technology - Automatic identification and data capture techniques - Data Matrix bar code symbology specification
 ISO/IEC 16023:2000 Information technology - International symbology specification - MaxiCode
 ISO 16032:2004 Acoustics – Measurement of sound pressure level from service equipment in buildings – Engineering method
 ISO 16034:2002 Ophthalmic optics – Specifications for single-vision ready-to-wear near- vision spectacles
 ISO 16039:2004 Road construction and maintenance equipment – Slipform pavers – Definitions and commercial specifications
 ISO 16054:2000 Implants for surgery – Minimum data sets for surgical implants
 ISO/TR 16056 Health informatics - Interoperability of telehealth systems and networks
 ISO/TR 16056-1:2004 Part 1: Introduction and definitions
 ISO/TR 16056-2:2004 Part 2: Real-time systems
 ISO/TS 16058:2004 Health informatics – Interoperability of telelearning systems
 ISO 16059:2007 Dentistry - Required elements for codification used in data exchange
 ISO 16061:2015 Instrumentation for use in association with non-active surgical implants – General requirements
 ISO 16063 Methods for the calibration of vibration and shock transducers
 ISO 16063-1:1998 Part 1: Basic concepts
 ISO 16063-11:1999 Part 11: Primary vibration calibration by laser interferometry
 ISO 16063-12:2002 Part 12: Primary vibration calibration by the reciprocity method
 ISO 16063-13:2001 Part 13: Primary shock calibration using laser interferometry
 ISO 16063-15:2006 Part 15: Primary angular vibration calibration by laser interferometry
 ISO 16063-16:2014 Part 16: Calibration by Earth's gravitation
 ISO 16063-17:2016 Part 17: Primary calibration by centrifuge
 ISO 16063-21:2003 Part 21: Vibration calibration by comparison to a reference transducer
 ISO 16063-22:2005 Part 22: Shock calibration by comparison to a reference transducer
 ISO 16063-31:2009 Part 31: Testing of transverse vibration sensitivity
 ISO 16063-32:2016 Part 32: Resonance testing – Testing the frequency and the phase response of accelerometers by means of shock excitation
 ISO 16063-33:2017 Part 33: Testing of magnetic field sensitivity
 ISO 16063-41:2011 Part 41: Calibration of laser vibrometers
 ISO 16063-42:2014 Part 42: Calibration of seismometers with high accuracy using acceleration of gravity
 ISO 16063-43:2015 Part 43: Calibration of accelerometers by model-based parameter identification
 ISO 16063-45:2017 Part 45: In-situ calibration of transducers with built in calibration coil
 ISO 16069:2004 Graphical symbols - Safety signs - Safety way guidance systems (SWGS)
 ISO/IEC 16085:2006 Systems and software engineering - Life cycle processes - Risk management
 ISO 16087:2013 Implants for surgery – Roentgen stereophotogrammetric analysis for the assessment of migration of orthopaedic implants
 ISO 16103:2005 Packaging - Transport packaging for dangerous goods - Recycled plastics material
 ISO 16106:2006 Packaging - Transport packages for dangerous goods - Dangerous goods packagings, intermediate bulk containers (IBCs) and large packagings—Guidelines for the application of ISO 9001
 ISO 16134 Earthquake- and subsidence-resistant design of ductile iron pipelines
 ISO 16140 Microbiology of the food chain – Method validation
 ISO 16140-1:2016 Part 1: Vocabulary
 ISO 16140-2:2016 Part 2: Protocol for the validation of alternative (proprietary) methods against a reference method
 ISO 16142 Medical devices – Recognized essential principles of safety and performance of medical devices
 ISO 16142-1:2016 Part 1: General essential principles and additional specific essential principles for all non-IVD medical devices and guidance on the selection of standards
 ISO 16142-2:2017 Part 2: General essential principles and additional specific essential principles for all IVD medical devices and guidance on the selection of standards
 ISO/TR 16153:2004 Piston-operated volumetric instruments – Determination of uncertainty for volume measurements made using the photometric method
 ISO 16155:2006 Ships and marine technology – Computer applications – Shipboard loading instruments
 ISO 16165:2013 Ships and marine technology - Marine environment protection - Terminology relating to oil spill response
 ISO/IEC TR 16166:2010 Information technology – Telecommunications and information exchange between systems – Next Generation Corporate Networks (NGCN) – Security of session-based communications
 ISO/IEC TR 16167:2011 Information technology – Telecommunications and information exchange between systems – Next Generation Corporate Networks (NGCN) – Emergency calls
 ISO 16175 Information and documentation - Principles and functional requirements for records in electronic office environments
 ISO 16175-1:2010 Part 1: Overview and statement of principles
 ISO 16175-2:2011 Part 2: Guidelines and functional requirements for digital records management systems
 ISO 16175-3:2010 Part 3: Guidelines and functional requirements for records in business systems
 ISO 16192:2017 Space systems - Experience gained in space projects (lessons learned) - Principles and guidelines
 ISO/TS 16195:2013 Nanotechnologies – Guidance for developing representative test materials consisting of nano-objects in dry powder form
 ISO/TR 16196:2016 Nanotechnologies – Compilation and description of sample preparation and dosing methods for engineered and manufactured nanomaterials
 ISO/TR 16197:2014 Nanotechnologies – Compilation and description of toxicological screening methods for manufactured nanomaterials
 ISO 16212:2017 Cosmetics – Microbiology – Enumeration of yeast and mould
 ISO/TR 16218:2013 Packaging and the environment - Processes for chemical recovery
 ISO 16232 Road vehicles – Cleanliness of components of fluid circuits
 ISO 16232-1:2007 Part 1: Vocabulary
 ISO 16232-2:2007 Part 2: Method of extraction of contaminants by agitation
 ISO 16232-3:2007 Part 3: Method of extraction of contaminants by pressure rinsing
 ISO 16232-4:2007 Part 4: Method of extraction of contaminants by ultrasonic techniques
 ISO 16232-5:2007 Part 5: Method of extraction of contaminants on functional test bench
 ISO 16232-6:2007 Part 6: Particle mass determination by gravimetric analysis
 ISO 16232-7:2007 Part 7: Particle sizing and counting by microscopic analysis
 ISO 16232-8:2007 Part 8: Particle nature determination by microscopic analysis
 ISO 16232-9:2007 Part 10: Particle sizing and counting by automatic light extinction particle counter
 ISO 16232-10:2007 Part 10: Expression of results
 ISO 16239:2013 Metric series wires for measuring screw threads
 ISO 16245:2009 Information and documentation - Boxes, file covers and other enclosures, made from cellulosic materials, for storage of paper and parchment documents
 ISO 16249:2013 Springs – Symbols
 ISO 16254:2016 Acoustics – Measurement of sound emitted by road vehicles of category M and N at standstill and low speed operation – Engineering method
 ISO/IEC 16262:2011 Information technology – Programming languages, their environments and system software interfaces – ECMAScript language specification
 ISO 16269 Statistical interpretation of data
 ISO 16269-4:2010 Part 4: Detection and treatment of outliers
 ISO 16269-6:2014 Part 6: Determination of statistical tolerance intervals
 ISO 16269-7:2001 Part 7: Median - Estimation and confidence intervals
 ISO 16269-8:2004 Part 8: Determination of prediction intervals
 ISO/TS 16277 Health informatics – Categorial structures of clinical findings in traditional medicine
 ISO/TS 16277-1:2015 Part 1: Traditional Chinese, Japanese and Korean medicine
 ISO 16278:2016 Health informatics – Categorial structure for terminological systems of human anatomy
 ISO 16284:2006 Ophthalmic optics – Information interchange for ophthalmic optical equipment
 ISO/TR 16310:2014 Symbol libraries for construction and facilities management
 ISO/IEC 16317:2011 Information technology – Telecommunications and information exchange between systems – proxZzzy for sleeping hosts
 ISO/IEC/IEEE 16326:2009 Systems and software engineering - Life cycle processes - Project management
 ISO 16331 Optics and optical instruments – Laboratory procedures for testing surveying and construction instruments
 ISO 16331-1:2017 Part 1: Performance of handheld laser distance meters
 ISO 16336:2014 Applications of statistical and related methods to new technology and product development process - Robust parameter design (RPD)
 ISO/IEC 16350:2015 Information technology - Systems and software engineering - Application management
 ISO/IEC 16353:2011 Information technology – Telecommunications and information exchange between systems – Front-end configuration command for NFC-WI (NFC-FEC)
 ISO 16355 Applications of statistical and related methods to new technology and product development process
 ISO 16355-1:2015 Part 1: General principles and perspectives of Quality Function Deployment (QFD)
 ISO 16355-2:2017 Part 2: Non-quantitative approaches for the acquisition of voice of customer and voice of stakeholder
 ISO 16355-4:2017 Part 4: Analysis of non-quantitative and quantitative Voice of Customer and Voice of Stakeholder
 ISO 16355-5:2017 Part 5: Solution strategy
 ISO/TR 16355-8:2017 Part 8: Guidelines for commercialization and life cycle
 ISO/TR 16379:2014 Tissue-engineered medical products – Evaluation of anisotropic structure of articular cartilage using DT (Diffusion Tensor)-MR Imaging
 ISO/IEC 16382:2000 Information technology – Data interchange on 12,7 mm 208-track magnetic tape cartridges – DLT 6 format
 ISO/IEC 16388:2007 Information technology - Automatic identification and data capture techniques - Code 39 bar code symbology specification
 ISO/IEC 16390:2007 Information technology - Automatic identification and data capture techniques - Interleaved 2 of 5 bar code symbology specification
 ISO/TS 16401 Electronic fee collection – Evaluation of equipment for conformity to ISO/TS 17575-2
 ISO/TS 16401-1:2012 Part 1: Test suite structure and test purposes
 ISO/TS 16401-2:2012 Part 2: Abstract test suite
 ISO 16402:2008 Implants for surgery – Acrylic resin cement – Flexural fatigue testing of acrylic resin cements used in orthopaedics
 ISO/TS 16407 Electronic fee collection – Evaluation of equipment for conformity to ISO/TS 17575-1
 ISO/TS 16407-1:2011 Part 1: Test suite structure and test purposes
 ISO/TS 16407-2:2012 Part 2: Abstract test suite
 ISO/TS 16410 Electronic fee collection – Evaluation of equipment for conformity to ISO/TS 17575-3
 ISO/TS 16410-1:2011 Part 1: Test suite structure and test purposes
 ISO/TS 16410-2:2012 Part 2: Abstract test suite
 ISO 16413:2013 Evaluation of thickness, density and interface width of thin films by X-ray reflectometry – Instrumental requirements, alignment and positioning, data collection, data analysis and reporting
 ISO 16428:2005 Implants for surgery – Test solutions and environmental conditions for static and dynamic corrosion tests on implantable materials and medical devices
 ISO 16429:2004 Implants for surgery – Measurements of open-circuit potential to assess corrosion behaviour of metallic implantable materials and medical devices over extended time periods
 ISO 16437:2012 Ships and marine technology - Lifesaving and fire protection - Atmospheric oil mist detectors for ships
 ISO 16439:2014 Information and documentation - Methods and procedures for assessing the impact of libraries
 ISO 16443:2014 Dentistry - Vocabulary for dental implants systems and related procedure
 ISO/IEC 16448:2002 Information technology - 120 mm DVD - Read-only disk
 ISO/IEC 16449:2002 Information technology - 80 mm DVD - Read-only disk
 ISO 16457:2014 Space systems – Space environment (natural and artificial) – The Earth's ionosphere model: international reference ionosphere (IRI) model and extensions to the plasmasphere
 ISO/TS 16460:2016 Intelligent transport systems – Communications access for land mobiles (CALM) – Communication protocol messages for global usage
 ISO/IEC 16480:2015 Information technology - Automatic identification and data capture techniques - Reading and display of ORM by mobile devices
 ISO 16484 Building automation and control systems (BACS)
 ISO 16484-1:2010 Part 1: Project specification and implementation
 ISO 16484-2:2004 Part 2: Hardware
 ISO 16484-3:2005 Part 3: Functions
 ISO 16484-5:2017 Part 5: Data communication protocol
 ISO 16484-6:2014 Part 6: Data communication conformance testing
 ISO/IEC 16485:2000 Information technology - Mixed Raster Content (MRC)
 ISO 16495:2013 Packaging - Transport packaging for dangerous goods - Test methods 
 ISO/IEC 16500 Information technology – Generic digital audio-visual systems
 ISO/IEC 16500-1:1999 Part 1: System reference models and scenarios
 ISO/IEC 16500-2:1999 Part 2: System dynamics, scenarios and protocol requirements
 ISO/IEC 16500-3:1999 Part 3: Contours: Technology domain
 ISO/IEC 16500-4:1999 Part 4: Lower-layer protocols and physical interfaces
 ISO/IEC 16500-5:1999 Part 5: High and mid-layer protocols
 ISO/IEC 16500-6:1999 Part 6: Information representation
 ISO/IEC 16500-7:1999 Part 7: Basic security tools
 ISO/IEC 16500-8:1999 Part 8: Management architecture and protocols
 ISO/IEC 16500-9:1999 Part 9: Usage information protocols
 ISO/IEC TR 16501:1999 Information technology - Generic digital audio-visual systems - Technical Report on ISO/IEC 16500 - Description of digital audio-visual functionalities
 ISO/IEC 16504:2011 Information technology – Telecommunications and information exchange between systems – MAC and PHY for operation in TV white space
 ISO/IEC 16509:1999 Information technology - Year 2000 terminology
 ISO/IEC 16512 Information technology – Relayed multicast protocol
 ISO/IEC 16512-1:2016 Information technology – Relayed Multicast Control Protocol (RMCP) – Framework
 ISO/IEC 16512-2:2016 Information technology – Relayed multicast protocol: Specification for simplex group applications
 ISO/IEC 16513:2005 Information technology – Group management protocol
 ISO/HL7 16527:2016 Health informatics – HL7 Personal Health Record System Functional Model, Release 1 (PHRS FM)
 ISO 16548:2012 Ships and marine technology - Ship design - General guidance on emergency towing procedures
 ISO 16549 Textiles – Unevenness of textile strands – Capacitance method
 ISO/TS 16550:2014 Nanotechnologies – Determination of silver nanoparticles potency by release of muramic acid from Staphylococcus aureus
 ISO 16559:2014 Solid biofuels – Terminology, definitions and descriptions
 ISO 16571:2014 Systems for evacuation of plume generated by medical devices
 ISO 16587:2004 Mechanical vibration and shock – Performance parameters for condition monitoring of structures
 ISO 16589 Rotary shaft lip-type seals incorporating thermoplastic sealing elements
 ISO 16589-2:2011 Part 2: Vocabulary
 ISO 16609:2012 Financial services – Requirements for message authentication using symmetric techniques
 ISO 16610 Geometrical product specifications (GPS) – Filtration
 ISO 16612 Graphic technology - Variable printing data exchange
 ISO 16612-1:2005 Part 1: Using PPML 2.1 and PDF 1.4 (PPML/VDX-2005)
 ISO 16612-2:2010 Part 2: Using PDF/X-4 and PDF/X-5 (PDF/VT-1 and PDF/VT-2)
 ISO 16613 Graphic technology - Variable content replacement
 ISO 16613-1:2017 Part 1: Using PDF/X for variable content replacement (PDF/VCR-1)
 ISO 16622:2002 Meteorology – Sonic anemometers/thermometers – Acceptance test methods for mean wind measurements
 ISO 16628:2008 Tracheobronchial tubes – Sizing and marking
 ISO 16638 Radiological protection - Monitoring and internal dosimetry for specific materials
 ISO 16638-1:2015 Part 1: Inhalation of uranium compounds
 ISO 16641:2014 Measurement of radioactivity in the environment - Air - Radon 220: Integrated measurement methods for the determination of the average activity concentration using passive solid-state nuclear track detectors
 ISO 16642:2017 Computer applications in terminology — Terminological markup framework
 ISO 16649 Microbiology of the food chain – Horizontal method for the enumeration of beta-glucuronidase-positive Escherichia coli
 ISO 16649-1:2001 Part 1: Colony-count technique at 44 degrees C using membranes and 5-bromo-4-chloro-3-indolyl beta-D-glucuronide
 ISO 16649-2:2001 Part 2: Colony-count technique at 44 degrees C using 5-bromo-4-chloro-3-indolyl beta-D-glucuronide
 ISO 16649-3:2015 Part 3: Detection and most probable number technique using 5-bromo-4-chloro-3-indolyl-ß-D-glucuronide
 ISO 16654:2001 Microbiology of food and animal feeding stuffs – Horizontal method for the detection of Escherichia coli O157
 ISO 16671:2015 Ophthalmic implants – Irrigating solutions for ophthalmic surgery
 ISO 16672:2015 Ophthalmic implants – Ocular endotamponades
 ISO 16682:2015 Aerospace series – Terminology for clamping devices
 ISO 16684 Graphic technology - Extensible metadata platform (XMP) specification
 ISO 16684-1:2012 Part 1: Data model, serialization and core properties
 ISO 16684-2:2014 Part 2: Description of XMP schemas using RELAX NG
 ISO/TR 16705:2016 Statistical methods for implementation of Six Sigma - Selected illustrations of contingency table analysis
 ISO 16706:2016 Ships and marine technology - Marine evacuation systems - Load calculations and testing
 ISO 16707:2016 Ships and marine technology - Marine evacuation systems - Determination of capacity
 ISO 16739:2013 Industry Foundation Classes (IFC) for data sharing in the construction and facility management industries
 ISO 16739-1:2018 Industry Foundation Classes (IFC) for data sharing in the construction and facility management industries — Part 1: Data schema
 ISO 16744:2003 Dentistry — Base metal materials for fixed dental restorations [Withdrawn: replaced with ISO 22674]
 ISO 16750 Road vehicles – Environmental conditions and testing for electrical and electronic equipment
 ISO 16760:2014 Graphic technology - Prepress data exchange - Preparation and visualization of RGB images to be used in RGB-based graphics arts workflows
 ISO/TR 16764:2003 Lifts, escalators and passenger conveyors – Comparison of worldwide standards on electromagnetic interference/electromagnetic compatibility
 ISO/TS 16785:2014 Electronic Fee Collection (EFC) – Interface definition between DSRC-OBE and external in-vehicle devices
 ISO/TR 16786:2015 Intelligent transport systems – The use of simulation models for evaluation of traffic management systems – Input parameters and reporting template for simulation of traffic signal control systems
 ISO 16787:2016 Intelligent transport systems – Assisted Parking System (APS) – Performance requirements and test procedures
 ISO/TS 16791:2014 Health informatics – Requirements for international machine-readable coding of medicinal product package identifiers
 ISO 16792:2015 Technical product documentation - Digital product definition data practices
 ISO 16818:2008 Building environment design – Energy efficiency – Terminology
 ISO/IEC 16824:1999 Information technology - 120 mm DVD rewritable disk (DVD-RAM)
 ISO/IEC 16825:1999 Information technology - Case for 120 mm DVD-RAM disks
 ISO 16832:2006 Acoustics – Loudness scaling by means of categories
 ISO 16840 Wheelchair seating
 ISO 16840-1:2006 Part 1: Vocabulary, reference axis convention and measures for body segments, posture and postural support surfaces
 ISO/TS 16843 Health informatics – Categorial structures for representation of acupuncture
 ISO/TS 16843-1:2016 Part 1: Acupuncture points
 ISO/TS 16843-2:2015 Part 2: Needling
 ISO 16894:2009 Wood-based panels – Oriented strand board (OSB) – Definitions, classification and specifications
 ISO 16902 Hydraulic fluid power – Test code for the determination of sound power levels of pumps using sound intensity techniques: Engineering method
 ISO 16902-1:2003 Part 1: Pumps
 ISO 16919:2014 Space data and information transfer systems – Requirements for bodies providing audit and certification of candidate trustworthy digital repositories
 ISO/TS 16949 Quality management systems – Particular requirements for the application of ISO 9001:2008 for automotive production and relevant service part organizations [Withdrawn: replaced by IATF 16949:2016]
 ISO/TS 16951:2004 Road vehicles – Ergonomic aspects of transport information and control systems (TICS) – Procedures for determining priority of on-board messages presented to drivers
 ISO/TS 16955:2016 Prosthetics – Quantification of physical parameters of ankle foot devices and foot units
 ISO/IEC 16963:2017 Information technology - Digitally recorded media for information interchange and storage - Test method for the estimation of lifetime of optical disks for long-term data storage
 ISO/IEC 16969:1999 Information technology - Data interchange on 120 mm optical disk cartridges using +RW format - Capacity: 3,0 Gbytes and 6,0 Gbytes
 ISO 16971:2015 Ophthalmic instruments – Optical coherence tomograph for the posterior segment of the human eye
 ISO/TR 16982:2002 Ergonomics of human-system interaction – Usability methods supporting human-centred design

ISO 17000 – ISO 17999
 ISO/IEC 17000:2004 Conformity assessment - Vocabulary and general principles
 ISO/IEC 17007:2009 Conformity assessment – Guidance for drafting normative documents suitable for use for conformity assessment
 ISO/IEC 17011:2017 Conformity assessment – Requirements for accreditation bodies accrediting conformity assessment bodies
 ISO/IEC 17020:2012 Conformity assessment—Requirements for the operation of various types of bodies performing inspection
 ISO/IEC 17021:2011 Conformity assessment—Requirements for bodies providing audit and certification of management systems
 ISO/IEC 17021-1:2015 Part 1: Requirements
 ISO/IEC 17021-2:2016 Part 2: Competence requirements for auditing and certification of environmental management systems
 ISO/IEC 17021-3:2017 Part 3: Competence requirements for auditing and certification of quality management systems
 ISO/IEC TS 17021-4:2013 Part 4: Competence requirements for auditing and certification of event sustainability management systems
 ISO/IEC TS 17021-5:2014 Part 5: Competence requirements for auditing and certification of asset management systems
 ISO/IEC TS 17021-6:2014 Part 6: Competence requirements for auditing and certification of business continuity management systems
 ISO/IEC TS 17021-7:2014 Part 7: Competence requirements for auditing and certification of road traffic safety management systems
 ISO/IEC TS 17021-9:2016 Part 9: Competence requirements for auditing and certification of anti-bribery management systems
 ISO/IEC TS 17022:2012 Conformity assessment—Requirements and recommendations for content of a third-party audit report on management systems
 ISO/IEC TS 17023:2013 Conformity assessment—Guidelines for determining the duration of management system certification audits
 ISO/IEC 17024:2012 Conformity assessment – General requirements for bodies operating certification of persons
 ISO/IEC 17025:2017 General requirements for the competence of testing and calibration laboratories
 ISO/IEC TR 17026:2015 Conformity assessment – Example of a certification scheme for tangible products
 ISO/IEC TS 17027:2014 Conformity assessment – Vocabulary related to competence of persons used for certification of persons
 ISO/IEC TR 17028:2017 Conformity assessment – Guidelines and examples of a certification scheme for services
 ISO/IEC 17029:2019 Conformity assessment — General principles and requirements for validation and verification bodies
 ISO/IEC 17030:2003 Conformity assessment – General requirements for third-party marks of conformity
 ISO/IEC 17033:2019 Ethical claims and supporting information - Principles and requirements
 ISO 17034:2016 General requirements for the competence of reference material producers
 ISO/IEC 17040:2005 Conformity assessment – General requirements for peer assessment of conformity assessment bodies and accreditation bodies
 ISO/IEC 17043:2010 Conformity assessment – General requirements for proficiency testing
 ISO 17049:2013 Accessible design - Application of braille on signage, equipment and appliances
 ISO/IEC 17050:2004 Conformity assessment — Supplier's declaration of conformity
 ISO/IEC 17050-1:2004 Part 1: General requirements (reviewed and confirmed in 2020) 
 ISO/IEC 17050-2:2004 Part 2: Supporting documentation (reviewed and confirmed in 2020) 
 ISO/IEC 17065:2012 Conformity assessment—Requirements for bodies certifying products, processes and services
 ISO 17066:2007 Hydraulic tools - Vocabulary
 ISO/IEC 17067:2013 Conformity assessment – Fundamentals of product certification and guidelines for product certification schemes
 ISO/TR 17068:2012 Information and documentation - Trusted third party repository for digital records
 ISO 17075 Leather - Chemical determination of chromium(VI) content in leather
 ISO 17075-1:2017 Part 1: Colorimetric method
 ISO 17075-2:2017 Part 2: Chromatographic method
 ISO 17080:2005 Manually portable agricultural and forestry machines and powered lawn and garden equipment - Design principles for single-panel product safety labels
 ISO 17088:2012 Specifications for compostable plastics
 ISO 17089 Measurement of fluid flow in closed conduits – Ultrasonic meters for gas
 ISO 17089-1:2010 Part 1: Meters for custody transfer and allocation measurement
 ISO 17089-2:2012 Part 2: Meters for industrial applications
 ISO 17090 Health informatics – Public key infrastructure
 ISO 17090-1:2013 Part 1: Overview of digital certificate services
 ISO 17090-2:2015 Part 2: Certificate profile
 ISO 17090-3:2008 Part 3: Policy management of certification authority
 ISO 17090-4:2014 Part 4: Digital Signatures for healthcare documents
 ISO 17090-5:2017 Part 5: Authentication using Healthcare PKI credentials
 ISO/TR 17098:2013 Packaging material recycling - Report on substances and materials which may impede recycling
 ISO 17100:2015 Translation services—Requirements for translation services
 ISO 17115:2007 Health informatics - Vocabulary of compositional terminological systems
 ISO/TS 17117:2002 Health informatics - Controlled health terminology - Structure and high-level indicators
 ISO 17117 Health informatics — Terminological resources
 ISO 17117-1:2018 Part 1: Characteristics
 ISO/TR 17119:2005 Health informatics – Health informatics profiling framework
 ISO 17123 Optics and optical instruments – Field procedures for testing geodetic and surveying instruments
 ISO 17123-1:2014 Part 1: Theory
 ISO 17123-2:2001 Part 2: Levels
 ISO 17123-3:2001 Part 3: Theodolites
 ISO 17123-4:2012 Part 4: Electro-optical distance meters (EDM measurements to reflectors)
 ISO 17123-5:2012 Part 5: Total stations
 ISO 17123-6:2012 Part 6: Rotating lasers
 ISO 17123-7:2005 Part 7: Optical plumbing instruments
 ISO 17123-8:2015 Part 8: GNSS field measurement systems in real-time kinematic (RTK)
 ISO/TS 17137:2014 Cardiovascular implants and extracorporeal systems – Cardiovascular absorbable implants
 ISO 17166:1999 Erythema reference action spectrum and standard erythema dose
 ISO 17185 Intelligent transport systems – Public transport user information
 ISO 17185-1:2014 Part 1: Standards framework for public information systems
 ISO/TR 17185-2:2015 Part 2: Public transport data and interface standards catalogue and cross references
 ISO/TR 17185-3:2015 Part 3: Use cases for journey planning systems and their interoperation
 ISO/TS 17187:2013 Intelligent transport systems – Electronic information exchange to facilitate the movement of freight and its intermodal transfer – Governance rules to sustain electronic information exchange methods
 ISO/TS 17200:2013 Nanotechnology – Nanoparticles in powder form – Characteristics and measurements
 ISO 17201 Acoustics – Noise from shooting ranges
 ISO 17201-1:2005 Part 1: Determination of muzzle blast by measurement
 ISO 17201-2:2006 Part 2: Estimation of muzzle blast and projectile sound by calculation
 ISO 17201-3:2010 Part 3: Guidelines for sound propagation calculations
 ISO 17201-4:2006 Part 4: Prediction of projectile sound
 ISO 17201-5:2010 Part 5: Noise management
 ISO 17202 Textiles – Determination of twist in single spun yarns – Untwist/retwist method
 ISO/IEC 17203:2017 Information technology – Open Virtualization Format (OVF) specification
 ISO 17208 Underwater acoustics – Quantities and procedures for description and measurement of underwater sound from ships
 ISO 17208-1:2016 Part 1: Requirements for precision measurements in deep water used for comparison purposes
 ISO 17218:2014 Sterile acupuncture needles for single use
 ISO/TS 17251:2016 Health informatics – Business requirements for a syntax to exchange structured dose information for medicinal products
 ISO 17258:2015 Statistical methods - Six Sigma - Basic criteria underlying benchmarking for Six Sigma in organisations
 ISO 17261:2012 Intelligent transport systems – Automatic vehicle and equipment identification – Intermodal goods transport architecture and terminology
 ISO 17262:2012 Intelligent transport systems – Automatic vehicle and equipment identification – Numbering and data structures
 ISO 17263:2012 Intelligent transport systems – Automatic vehicle and equipment identification – System parameters
 ISO 17264:2009 Intelligent transport systems – Automatic vehicle and equipment identification – Interfaces
 ISO 17267:2009 Intelligent transport systems – Navigation systems – Application programming interface (API)
 ISO/TR 17302:2015 Nanotechnologies – Framework for identifying vocabulary development for nanotechnology applications in human healthcare
 ISO/IEC 17309:2000 Information technology – Telecommunications and information exchange between systems – Private Integrated Services Network – Mapping functions for the employment of a circuit mode basic service and the supplementary service user-to-user signalling as a pair of on-demand inter-PINX connections
 ISO/IEC 17310:2000 Information technology – Telecommunications and information exchange between systems – Private Integrated Services Network – Mapping functions for the employment of 64 kbit/s circuit mode connections with 16 kbit/s sub-multiplexing
 ISO/IEC 17311:2000 Information technology – Telecommunications and information exchange between systems – Private Integrated Services Network – Mapping functions for the employment of 64 kbit/s circuit mode connections with 8 kbit/s sub-multiplexing
 ISO 17316:2015 Information and documentation - International standard link identifier (ISLI)
 ISO 17338:2009 Ships and marine technology - Drawings for fire protection - Indications of fire rating by divisions for ships and high-speed craft
 ISO/IEC 17341:2009 Information technology - Data interchange on 120 mm and 80 mm optical disk using +RW format - Capacity: 4,7 Gbytes and 1,46 Gbytes per side (recording speed up to 4X)
 ISO/IEC 17342:2004 Information technology - 80 mm (1,46 Gbytes per side) and 120 mm (4,70 Gbytes per side) DVD re-recordable disk (DVD-RW)
 ISO/IEC 17343:2007 Information technology – Telecommunications and information exchange between systems – Corporate telecommunication networks – Signalling interworking between QSIG and SIP – Basic services
 ISO/IEC 17344:2009 Information technology - Data interchange on 120 mm and 80 mm optical disk using +R format - Capacity: 4,7 Gbytes and 1,46 Gbytes per side (recording speed up to 16X)
 ISO/IEC 17345:2006 Information technology - Data Interchange on 130 mm Rewritable and Write Once Read Many Ultra Density Optical (UDO) Disk Cartridges - Capacity: 30 Gbytes per Cartridge - First Generation
 ISO/IEC 17346:2005 Information technology - Data interchange on 90 mm optical disk cartridges - Capacity: 1,3 Gbytes per cartridge
 ISO/TR 17350:2013 Direct Marking on Plastic Returnable Transport Items (RTIs)
 ISO 17351:2013 Packaging - Braille on packaging for medicinal products
 ISO 17359:2011 Condition monitoring and diagnostics of machines – General guidelines
 ISO 17361:2017 Intelligent transport systems – Lane departure warning systems – Performance requirements and test procedures
 ISO 17363:2013 Supply chain applications of RFID - Freight containers
 ISO 17364:2013 Supply chain applications of RFID - Returnable transport items (RTIs) and returnable packaging items (RPIs)
 ISO 17365:2013 Supply chain applications of RFID - Transport units
 ISO 17366:2013 Supply chain applications of RFID - Product packaging
 ISO 17367:2013 Supply chain applications of RFID - Product tagging
 ISO 17369:2013 Statistical data and metadata exchange (SDMX)
 ISO/TR 17370:2013 Application Guideline on Data Carriers for Supply Chain Management
 ISO/TR 17384:2008 Intelligent transport systems – Interactive centrally determined route guidance (CDRG) – Air interface message set, contents and format
 ISO 17387:2008 Intelligent transport systems – Lane change decision aid systems (LCDAS) – Performance requirements and test procedures
 ISO 17398:2004 Safety colours and safety signs - Classification, performance and durability of safety signs
 ISO 17410:2001 Microbiology of food and animal feeding stuffs – Horizontal method for the enumeration of psychrotrophic microorganisms
 ISO/IEC 17417:2011 Information technology – Telecommunications and information exchange between systems – Short Distance Visible Light Communication (SDVLC)
 ISO/TS 17419:2014 Intelligent transport systems – Cooperative systems – Classification and management of ITS applications in a global context
 ISO/TS 17423:2014 Intelligent transport systems – Cooperative systems – ITS application requirements and objectives for selection of communication profiles
 ISO/TR 17424:2015 Intelligent transport systems – Cooperative systems – State of the art of Local Dynamic Maps concepts
 ISO/TS 17425:2016 Intelligent transport systems – Cooperative systems – Data exchange specification for in-vehicle presentation of external road and traffic related data
 ISO/TS 17426:2016 Intelligent transport systems – Cooperative systems – Contextual speeds
 ISO 17427 Intelligent transport systems – Cooperative ITS
 ISO/TS 17427:2014 Roles and responsibilities in the context of cooperative ITS based on architecture(s) for cooperative systems
 ISO/TR 17427-2:2015 Part 2: Framework overview
 ISO/TR 17427-3:2015 Part 3: Concept of operations (ConOps) for 'core' systems
 ISO/TR 17427-4:2015 Part 4: Minimum system requirements and behaviour for core systems
 ISO/TR 17427-6:2015 Part 6: 'Core system' risk assessment methodology
 ISO/TR 17427-7:2015 Part 7: Privacy aspects
 ISO/TR 17427-8:2015 Part 8: Liability aspects
 ISO/TR 17427-9:2015 Part 9: Compliance and enforcement aspects
 ISO/TR 17427-10:2015 Part 10: Driver distraction and information display
 ISO/TS 17429:2017 Intelligent transport systems – Cooperative ITS – ITS station facilities for the transfer of information between ITS stations
 ISO 17432:2004 Health informatics – Messages and communication – Web access to DICOM persistent objects
 ISO 17438 Intelligent transport systems – Indoor navigation for personal and vehicle ITS station
 ISO 17438-1:2016 Part 1: General information and use case definition
 ISO/TS 17439:2014 Health informatics – Development of terms and definitions for health informatics glossaries
 ISO 17442:2012 Financial services - Legal Entity Identifier (LEI)
 ISO/TS 17444 Electronic fee collection – Charging performance
 ISO/TS 17444-1:2017 Part 1: Metrics
 ISO/TS 17444-2:2017 Part 2: Examination framework
 ISO 17450 Geometrical product specifications (GPS) - Basic concepts
 ISO 17450-1:2011 Part 1: Model for geometrical specification and verification
 ISO 17450-2:2012 Part 2: Basic tenets, specifications, operators, uncertainties and ambiguities
 ISO 17450-3:2016 Part 3: Toleranced features
 ISO 17450-4:2017 Part 4: Geometrical characteristics for quantifying GPS deviations
 ISO 17451 Packaging - Codification of contents for inventories for shipments of household goods and personal effects
 ISO 17451-1:2016 Part 1: Numeric codification of inventories
 ISO/TS 17451-2:2017 Part 2: XML messaging structure for electronic transmission of inventory data
 ISO/TR 17452:2007 Intelligent transport systems – Using UML for defining and documenting ITS/TICS interfaces
 ISO/IEC 17462:2000 Information technology – 3,81 mm wide magnetic tape cartridge for information interchange – Helical scan recording – DDS-4 format
 ISO/TR 17465 Intelligent transport systems - Cooperative ITS
 ISO/TR 17465-1:2014 Part 1: Terms and definitions
 ISO/TR 17465-2:2015 Part 2: Guidelines for standards documents
 ISO/TR 17465-3:2015 Part 3: Release procedures for standards documents
 ISO/TS 17466:2015 Use of UV-Vis absorption spectroscopy in the characterization of cadmium chalcogenide colloidal quantum dots
 ISO 17468:2016 Microbiology of the food chain – Technical requirements and guidance on establishment or revision of a standardized reference method
 ISO 17469 Document management - Strategy markup language (StratML)
 ISO 17469-1:2015 Part 1: StratML core elements
 ISO 17480:2015 Packaging - Accessible design - Ease of opening
 ISO 17488:2016 Road vehicles – Transport information and control systems – Detection-response task (DRT) for assessing attentional effects of cognitive load in driving
 ISO/TS 17503:2015 Statistical methods of uncertainty evaluation - Guidance on evaluation of uncertainty using two-factor crossed designs
 ISO/PAS 17506 Industrial automation systems and integration – COLLADA digital asset schema specification for 3D visualization of industrial data
 ISO 17510:2015 Medical devices – Sleep apnoea breathing therapy – Masks and application accessories
 ISO 17515 Intelligent transport systems – Communications access for land mobiles (CALM) – Evolved universal terrestrial radio access network (E-UTRAN)
 ISO 17515-1:2015 Part 1: General usage
 ISO 17516:2014 Cosmetics – Microbiology – Microbiological limits
 ISO/TR 17522:2015 Health informatics – Provisions for health applications on mobile/smart devices
 ISO 17523:2016 Health informatics – Requirements for electronic prescriptions
 ISO 17526:2003 Optics and optical instruments – Lasers and laser-related equipment – Lifetime of lasers
 ISO 17532:2007 Stationary equipment for agriculture – Data communications network for livestock farming
 ISO 17534 Acoustics – Software for the calculation of sound outdoors
 ISO 17534-1:2015 Part 1: Quality requirements and quality assurance
 ISO/TR 17534-2:2014 Part 2: General recommendations for test cases and quality assurance interface
 ISO/TR 17534-3:2015 Part 3: Recommendations for quality assured implementation of ISO 9613-2 in software according to ISO 17534-1
 ISO/IEC 17549 Information technology – User interface guidelines on menu navigation
 ISO/IEC 17549-2:2015 Part 2: Navigation with 4-direction devices
 ISO/IEC 17568:2013 Information technology – Telecommunications and information exchange between systems – Close proximity electric induction wireless communications
 ISO 17572 Intelligent transport systems (ITS) – Location referencing for geographic databases
 ISO 17572-1:2015 Part 1: General requirements and conceptual model
 ISO 17572-2:2015 Part 2: Pre-coded location references (pre-coded profile)
 ISO 17572-3:2015 Part 3: Dynamic location references (dynamic profile)
 ISO 17573:2010 Electronic fee collection – Systems architecture for vehicle-related tolling
 ISO/TS 17574:2017 Electronic fee collection – Guidelines for security protection profiles
 ISO 17575 Electronic fee collection – Application interface definition for autonomous systems
 ISO 17575-1:2016 Part 1: Charging
 ISO 17575-2:2016 Part 2: Communication and connection to the lower layers
 ISO 17575-3:2016 Part 3: Context data
 ISO/TS 17582:2014 Quality management systems – Particular requirements for the application of ISO 9001:2008 for electoral organizations at all levels of government
 ISO/IEC 17592:2004 Information technology - 120 mm (4,7 Gbytes per side) and 80 mm (1,46 Gbytes per side) DVD rewritable disk (DVD-RAM) 
 ISO/IEC 17594:2004 Information technology - Cases for 120 mm and 80 mm DVD-RAM disks
 ISO 17599:2015 Technical product documentation (TPD) – General requirements of digital mock-up for mechanical products
 ISO 17604:2015 Microbiology of the food chain – Carcass sampling for microbiological analysis
 ISO 17631:2002 Ships and marine technology - Shipboard plans for fire protection, life-saving appliances and means of escape
 ISO 17658:2002 Welding - Imperfections in oxyfuel flame cuts, laser beam cuts and plasma cuts - Terminology
 ISO 17659:2002 Welding - Multilingual terms for welded joints with illustrations
 ISO 17677 Resistance welding - Vocabulary
 ISO 17677-1:2009 Part 1: Spot, projection and seam welding
 ISO 17679:2016 Tourism and related services – Wellness spa – Service requirements
 ISO 17680:2015 Tourism and related services – Thalassotherapy – Service requirements
 ISO 17687:2007 Transport Information and Control Systems (TICS) – General fleet management and commercial freight operations – Data dictionary and message sets for electronic identification and monitoring of hazardous materials/dangerous goods transportation
ISO 17712:2103 Freight containers — Mechanical seals - updated the 2010 version: offers "a single source of information on mechanical seals which are acceptable for securing freight containers in international commerce". Supported by C-TPAT (the use of "H" class seals is required).
 ISO 17713 Meteorology – Wind measurements
 ISO 17713-1:2007 Part 1: Wind tunnel test methods for rotating anemometer performance
 ISO 17714:2007 Meteorology – Air temperature measurements – Test methods for comparing the performance of thermometer shields/screens and defining important characteristics
 ISO 17717:2017 Meteorological balloons – Specification
 ISO 17724:2003 Graphical symbols - Vocabulary
 ISO/TS 17728:2015 Microbiology of the food chain – Sampling techniques for microbiological analysis of food and feed samples
 ISO 17740 Building construction machinery and equipment – Concrete placing systems for stationary equipment
 ISO 17740-1:2015 Part 1: Terminology and commercial specifications
 ISO/IEC 17760 Information technology - AT Attachment
 ISO/IEC 17760-101:2015 Part 101: ATA/ATAPI Command Set (ATA8-ACS)
 ISO/IEC 17760-102:2016 Part 102: ATA/ATAPI Command set - 2 (ACS-2)
 ISO 17772 Energy performance of buildings - Indoor environmental quality
 ISO 17772-1:2017 Part 1: Indoor environmental input parameters for the design and assessment of energy performance of buildings
 ISO 17776 Petroleum and natural gas industries – Offshore production installations – Guidelines on tools and techniques for hazard identification and risk assessment
 ISO/IEC 17788:2014 Information technology - Cloud computing - Overview and vocabulary
 ISO/IEC 17789:2014 Information technology - Cloud computing - Reference architecture
 ISO/TR 17791:2013 Health informatics – Guidance on standards for enabling safety in health software
 ISO 17799 Information technology - Security techniques - Code of Practice for Information Security Management (superseded by ISO/IEC 27002)
 ISO 17800 Building environment design – Facility Smart Grid Information Model
 ISO/IEC 17811 Information technology – Device control and management
 ISO/IEC 17811-1:2014 Part 1: Architecture
 ISO/IEC 17811-2:2015 Part 2: Specification of Device Control and Management Protocol
 ISO/IEC 17811-3:2014 Part 3: Specification of Reliable Message Delivery Protocol
 ISO/IEC 17821:2015 Information technology – Specification of low power wireless mesh network over channel-hopped TDMA links
 ISO/TS 17822 In vitro diagnostic test systems - Qualitative nucleic acid-based in vitro examination procedures for detection and identification of microbial pathogens
 ISO/TS 17822-1:2014 Part 1: General requirements, terms and definitions
 ISO/IEC 17825:2016 Information technology - Security techniques - Testing methods for the mitigation of non-invasive attack classes against cryptographic modules
 ISO/IEC 17826:2016 Information technology - Cloud Data Management Interface (CDMI)
 ISO/IEC 17839 Information technology – Identification cards – Biometric System-on-Card
 ISO/IEC 17839-1:2014 Part 1: Core requirements
 ISO/IEC 17839-2:2015 Part 2: Physical characteristics
 ISO/IEC 17839-3:2016 Part 3: Logical information interchange mechanism
 ISO 17853:2011 Wear of implant materials – Polymer and metal wear particles – Isolation and characterization
 ISO/TS 17863:2013 Geometrical product specification (GPS) - Tolerancing of moveable assemblies
 ISO/TS 17865:2016 Geometrical product specifications (GPS) - Guidelines for the evaluation of coordinate measuring machine (CMM) test uncertainty for CMMs using single and multiple stylus contacting probing systems
 ISO/IEC 17875:2000 Information technology – Telecommunications and information exchange between systems – Private Integrated Services Network – Specification, functional model and information flows – Private User Mobility (PUM) – Registration supplementary service
 ISO/IEC 17876:2003 Information technology – Telecommunications and information exchange between systems – Private Integrated Services Network – Inter-exchange signalling protocol—Private User Mobility (PUM) – Registration supplementary service
 ISO/IEC 17877:2000 Information technology – Telecommunications and information exchange between systems – Private Integrated Services Network – Specification, functional model and information flows – Private User Mobility (PUM) – Call handling additional network features
 ISO/IEC 17878:2003 Information technology – Telecommunications and information exchange between systems – Private Integrated Services Network – Inter-exchange signalling protocol – Private User Mobility (PUM) – Call handling additional network features
 ISO 17893:2004 Steel wire ropes - Vocabulary, designation and classification
 ISO 17894:2005 Ships and marine technology – Computer applications – General principles for the development and use of programmable electronic systems in marine applications
 ISO 17901 Optics and photonics – Holography
 ISO 17901-1:2015 Part 1: Methods of measuring diffraction efficiency and associated optical characteristics of holograms
 ISO 17901-2:2015 Part 2: Methods for measurement of hologram recording characteristics
 ISO 17907:2014 Ships and marine technology - Single point mooring arrangements for conventional tankers
 ISO/IEC 17913:2000 Information technology – 12,7mm 128-track magnetic tape cartridge for information interchange – Parallel serpentine format
 ISO/TS 17915:2013 Optics and photonics – Measurement method of semiconductor lasers for sensing
 ISO/TS 17919:2013 Microbiology of the food chain – Polymerase chain reaction (PCR) for the detection of food-borne pathogens – Detection of botulinum type A, B, E and F neurotoxin-producing clostridia
 ISO 17933:2000 GEDI - Generic Electronic Document Interchange
 ISO/TS 17938:2014 Health informatics – Semantic network framework of traditional Chinese medicine language system
 ISO 17937:2015 Dentistry - Osteotome
 ISO/TS 17948:2014 Health informatics – Traditional Chinese medicine literature metadata
 ISO/IEC 17960:2015 Information technology - Programming languages, their environments and system software interfaces - Code signing for source code
 ISO/IEC TS 17961:2013 Information technology - Programming languages, their environments and system software interfaces - C secure coding rules
 ISO/IEC 17963:2013 Web Services for Management (WS-Management) Specification
 ISO/TS 17969:2015 Petroleum, petrochemical and natural gas industries – Guidelines on competency for personnel
 ISO 17972 Graphic technology - Colour data exchange format (CxF/X)
 ISO 17972-1:2015 Part 1: Relationship to CxF3 (CxF/X)
 ISO 17972-2:2016 Part 2: Scanner target data (CxF/X-2)
 ISO 17972-3:2017 Part 3: Output target data (CxF/X-3)
 ISO 17972-4:2015 Part 4: Spot colour characterisation data (CxF/X-4)
 ISO/TS 17975:2015 Health informatics – Principles and data requirements for consent in the Collection, Use or Disclosure of personal health information
 ISO/IEC 17982:2012 Information technology – Telecommunications and information exchange between systems – Close Capacitive Coupling Communication Physical Layer (CCCC PHY)
 ISO 17987 Road vehicles – Local Interconnect Network (LIN)
 ISO 17987-2:2016 Part 2: Transport protocol and network layer services
 ISO 17994:2014 Water quality – Requirements for the comparison of the relative recovery of microorganisms by two quantitative methods
 ISO 17995:2005 Water quality – Detection and enumeration of thermotolerant Campylobacter species
 ISO/IEC 17998:2012 Information technology - SOA Governance Framework

Notes

References

External links 
 International Organization for Standardization
 ISO Certification Provider
 ISO Consultant

International Organization for Standardization